Millbrook School is a high school located in Winchester, Virginia. The school is one of three high schools in the Frederick County Public School System. It is one of the newest schools in the area, having been established in 2003, intended to relieve overpopulation in nearby James Wood High School and Sherando High School.

Schedule 
Millbrook High School uses a block scheduling system, utilizing Day 1 and Day 2 schedules.  Each block is one and a half hours long and meets every other day.  To accommodate lunch schedules, one class is forty-five minutes long and meets every day.  The school also uses a traditional 4 quarter system with each quarter lasting 9 weeks.

Athletics 
Millbrook High School plays in the AAAA Northwestern District. Despite its short athletic history, it has established strong programs in football golf, volleyball, tennis, cross country, basketball, track, swimming, baseball, wrestling, soccer, and cheerleading earning numerous district titles and back-to-back regional runner-up and regional titles in basketball. As of the 2012 season, the varsity girls' basketball had won a Virginia state record 80 consecutive games and became the first school in state history to win three consecutive state championships.

Notable alumni
 Erick Green (born 1991), basketball player in the Israeli Basketball Premier League

See also
Frederick County Public Schools
Frederick County, Virginia

References

External links
Millbrook High School homepage
Frederick County Public Schools

Public high schools in Virginia
Schools in Frederick County, Virginia
Educational institutions established in 2003
2003 establishments in Virginia